Paul Lundsten (born August 11, 1955) is an American lawyer and retired judge.  He served on the Wisconsin Court of Appeals for the Madison-based District IV court from 2000 until his retirement in 2019.

Early life and career
Lundsten was born on August 11, 1955, in La Crosse, Wisconsin. He earned his bachelor's degree from the University of Wisconsin–Madison in 1980, and went on to obtain his J.D. from the University of Wisconsin Law School in 1983.  

The same year he graduated from law school, Lundsten was hired by Bronson La Follette, then Wisconsin's Attorney General, to serve as an Assistant Attorney General in the Wisconsin Department of Justice.  Lundsten would continue to work as an assistant attorney general until his appointment to the Court of Appeals in 2000, serving under two more attorneys general: Don Hanaway and Jim Doyle.  At the Department of Justice, he was initially assigned to the Medicaid Fraud Control Unit.  Over his 17 years at the department, he worked on various fraud investigations and consumer protection cases, becoming a specialist in handling criminal cases before the appeals court.

Judicial career

On October 31, 2000, Governor Tommy Thompson appointed Lundsten to the Wisconsin Court of Appeals to replace retiring Judge William Eich.  Judge Lundsten was elected to a full term in 2001, defeating attorney Charlie Schutze, and was subsequently re-elected in 2007 and 2013.  In 2019 he announced he would not seek a fourth term.  He retired from the court July 31, 2019.

Personal life and family

Lundsten is married with three children.

Electoral history

| colspan="6" style="text-align:center;background-color: #e9e9e9;"| General Election, April 3, 2001

References

External links
 Official Wisconsin courts bio
 

Politicians from La Crosse, Wisconsin
Wisconsin Court of Appeals judges
Wisconsin lawyers
University of Wisconsin–Madison alumni
University of Wisconsin Law School alumni
1955 births
Living people